The Mesostigmatophyceae are a class of basal green algae found in freshwater. In a narrow circumscription, the class contains a single genus, Mesostigma. AlgaeBase then places the order within its circumscription of Charophyta. A clade containing Chlorokybus and Spirotaenia may either be added, or treated as a sister, with Chlorokybus placed in a separate class, Chlorokybophyceae. When broadly circumscribed, Mesostigmatophyceae may be placed as sister to all other green algae, or as sister to all Streptophyta.

References

External links

Scientific references

Scientific databases 

 
 AlgaTerra database
 Index Nominum Genericorum

Green algae classes
Charophyta